Krutant is a 2019 Indian Marathi-language Psychological thriller film directed by Datta Mohan Bhandare and produced by Miiheer Shah. The film stars Suyog Gorhe, Sayli Patil, Sandeep Kulkarni in lead roles. It was theatrically released on 18 January 2019.

Plot 

Samyak, a workaholic who struggles to balance his personal and professional life, agrees to a trip with his friends. On the way he meets Baba, a wise old man, whose story changes his life.

Cast 

 Sandeep Kulkarni as Baba
 Suyog Gorhe as Samyak
 Sayli Patil as Reva
 Vidya Karanjikar as Samyak's mother
 Vaishnavi Patwardhan

Soundtrack

Reception

Critical reception 
Fim received mixed reviews from critics. Rishab Deb of The Times of India gave 2 stars out of 5 and addressed as the average film. Tejal Gawade of Lokmat gave 2 out of 5 and wrote "Although the content of the movie is very good, the director has not been able to present it properly. The plot of the film feels disjointed at some places. The premise of the film is very boring and feels like a lecture. Philosophy aside, the film again builds suspense as the mystery begins.The attempt to make the movie exciting by giving a twist of suspense to a simple story has failed miserably." ABP Majha gave 2 stars and praised acting and addressed that the film falls a little short of being great. Mukund Kule of Maharashtra Times rate 2.5 out of 5 stars said "Overall the story is good, but the setting is a bit boring and clunky. An attempt has been made to make the movie mysterious by giving a suspenseful twist to the simple story of the movie." MPC News found foult in storytelling due to adding interest to the story, the story often moves around in one place which seems to slow down the pace of the film.

References

External links 

 

2019 films
Psychological drama films
2020s Marathi-language films
Indian psychological thriller films
Indian psychological drama films